is a Japanese term for one of the decorative techniques used in traditional crafts and woodwork. It refers to a method of inserting a board-like material, which is a cut out part of the mother of pearl inside the shell, into the carved surface of lacquer or wood, or a craft made by using this method. The kanji for  means 'shell' and  means 'inlaid'.  is a term used only for the technique or work of inlaying thin layers of pearl shells. In Japan, the technique of embedding the mother of pearl of shellfish in lacquer is called , while the technique of embedding metal or ivory is called .

The basic technique of  originated in Egypt around 3500 BC, and the technique spread along the Mediterranean coast. By the Tang Dynasty, Chinese  craftsmanship had reached a very mature level, especially lacquer-backed  on bronze mirrors, which was a treasure of craftsmanship in this period. Bronze mirrors with  lacquer backs have been excavated from Tang tombs in Shanxian County and Luoyang, Henan Province.

In Japan,  had been used in combination with Japanese various  techniques since the Heian period, but  declined in the Muromachi period. In the Edo period, many pieces of Japanese lacquerware were exported to royalty and nobility in Europe through Dutch East India Company and private traders.

The term may also be used for similar traditional work from Korea or countries in South-East Asia such as Vietnam, or for modern work done in the West.

Techniques of production

In , the shell is often cut with a scroll saw, then finished with a file or rubstone before application.

Methods of application are varied. Thick shell pieces may be inlaid into pre-carved settings, while thinner pieces may be pressed into a very thick coating of lacquer, or applied using an adhesive and then lacquered over. Other methods use acid washing and lacquering to produce different effects.

 is especially combined with  – gold or silver lacquer sprinkled with metal powder as a decoration.

History
In the Kamakura period (1185–1333),  was a popular saddle decoration.

 experienced rapid growth through Japan's Azuchi-Momoyama period (1568–1600), when Japan's borders were still open to the outside world, until the early 17th century, before the isolationism instituted by the  policy of the Edo period (1603–1867). The technique was often used in the creation of European-style items, such as chests of drawers and coffee cups, and was very popular in Europe, as the mother-of-pearl covering the items contributed to their status as a unique luxury. The Japanese referred to these goods as " lacquerware", with  meaning "Southern Barbarians", a term borrowed from the Chinese and, in 16th century Japan, meaning any foreigner, especially a European.

Until the 1690s, the Dutch East India Company monopolized the export of Japanese lacquerware throughout Europe, but the lacquerware using  technique using a large amount of gold was so expensive that the customers were limited to royalty and nobility, and after 1690, it was exported through private trade.

After the Opening of Japan to foreign trade in the 1850s,  work for export markets soon became significant again. The Somada style and Shibayama style lacquerware using the  technique became popular and were exported in large quantities from Yokohama to Europe and the United States. Somada ware is a style invented by Somada Kiyosuke in the 1670s, and is characterized by a regular pattern made of a combination of lacquer, finely cut shellfish, gold leaf and silver leaf. Shibayama ware is a style invented by Shibayama Senzo in the 1770s, characterized by the inlay of various materials such as shellfish, gold, silver, ivory, coral, tortoise shell, and ceramics.

The  works of a number of famous Edo period craftsmen are still celebrated, namely those of Tōshichi Ikushima, Chōbei Aogai, and the Somada brothers. is widespread in Japan today, and is made for many applications, modern and classic.

See also
 Damascening
 Mother-of-pearl carving in Bethlehem
 Nacre

References

External links

Japanese lacquerware
Japanese woodwork
Japanese art terminology
Seashells in art
Japanese words and phrases
Traditional art of East Asia